Warheads may refer to:

Warhead, an explosive device used in military conflicts
Warheads (band), a Swedish band
Warheads (candy), a brand of sour candy
Warheads (comics), a comic book published by Marvel UK
"Warheads" (song), a song by Extreme from the album III Sides to Every Story

See also
Warhead (disambiguation)